François Weyergans (2 August 1941 – 27 May 2019) was a Belgian writer and director. His father, Franz Weyergans, was a Belgian and also a writer, while his mother was from Avignon in France. François Weyergans was elected to the Académie française on 26 March 2009, taking the 32nd seat which became vacant with the death of Alain Robbe-Grillet in 2008.

Biography
He started film studies at the IDHEC (Hautes Études Cinématographiques), where he came to love the films of Robert Bresson and Jean-Luc Godard, among others. He soon began to write for Cahiers du cinéma and directed his first film in 1961, on Maurice Béjart, which led to his expulsion from the school as students were banned from making professional films.

Novels
After having been through some psychoanalysis, he published a satirical account of his treatment in a novel called Le Pitre (1971), which attracted some critical notice and won the Roger Nimier Prize. His second novel in 1981 was Macaire le Copte. This won the Prix Rossel in his native Belgium, as well as the Prix des Deux Magots in France. From then on, Weyergans devoted himself entirely to writing, spending whole nights working from 11 p.m. until noon. His subsequent works—mostly of an ironic autobiographical nature—also won literary prizes, including the "Prix Méridien des quatre jurys" in 1983 for Le radeau de la Méduse and the Prix Renaudot in 1992 for La démence du boxeur. Most recently, his Trois jours chez ma mère awarded him the Prix Goncourt in 2005. In this, he satirises his own famous difficulties in delivering a promised manuscript in time. In the process he creates a "Russian doll" type structure where he (Weyergans) writes as a writer, Weyergraf, who finds all sorts of distractions or reasons to avoid writing a book called Trois jours chez ma mère. He does this largely by inventing an author called Graffenberg, who in turn invents another author, Weyerstein, who sketches out a possible structure—but he keeps getting waylaid by humorous meditations on his own life, love (or just encounters), family, films and multiple enthusiasms and interests.

Films
 1962: Béjart
 1963: Hieronymus Bosch
 1965: Robert Bresson: Ni vu, ni connu (des portraits Cinéastes de notre temps), 65 minutes
 1967: Baudelaire is gestorven in de zomer
 1967: Aline
 1972: Un film sur quelqu'un
 1977: Maladie mortelle
 1977: Je t'aime, tu danses
 1978: Couleur Chair (Flesh Color)

References

Further reading
 Gardies, André (1972) Alain Robbe-Grillet. Paris: Seghers (study by André Gardies; texts and documents)
 Immoral Tales: European Sex & Horror Movies 1956-1984 (1994) by Cathal Tohill and Pete Tombs dedicates a chapter to his films.
 The Erotic Dream Machine: Interviews with Alain Robbe-Grillet on His Films (2006) by Anthony N Fragola, Alain Robbe-Grillet and Roch Charles Smith

External links
Biography, complete bibliography and citations of François Weyergans, in French
Interview with François Weyergans in French (Dec. 2005)

1941 births
2019 deaths
People from Etterbeek
Belgian writers in French
Prix Goncourt winners
Belgian film directors
Prix Renaudot winners
Prix des Deux Magots winners
Roger Nimier Prize winners
Members of the Académie Française
Analysands of Jacques Lacan
Chevaliers of the Légion d'honneur
Commandeurs of the Ordre des Arts et des Lettres
Belgian people of French descent
Belgian male novelists
20th-century Belgian male writers
20th-century Belgian novelists
21st-century Belgian male writers
21st-century Belgian novelists